The James River is a medium-sized river in central Alberta. It is a tributary of the Red Deer River.

Species of fish commonly found: Brown trout, rainbow trout, mountain whitefish, northern pike and a few others. It forms in the Rocky Mountains and flows eastward before joining the Red Deer River. The Forestry Trunk Road follows the river for much of its course. The James River is also bridged by Alberta Highway 22 near the unincorporated community of James River Bridge. The James River, as well as James Pass and James Lake, are named after James Dickson, a Stoney Chief who signed Treaty 7 with the Canadian government in 1877.

Tributaries 

Bridgeland Creek
Windfall Creek
Willson Creek
Sawtooth Creek
South James River
Parker Creek
Teepee Pole Creek
Stony Creek
Burnstick Lake
Pekse Creek

See also 
List of Alberta rivers

References 

Rivers of Alberta